The Waata (Waat, Watha), or Sanye, are an Oromo-speaking people of Kenya and former hunter-gatherers. They share the name Sanye with the neighboring Dahalo.

The current language of the Waata may be a dialect of Orma or otherwise Southern Oromo. However, there is evidence that they may have shifted from a Southern Cushitic language, a group that includes Dahalo.

See also

Degere

External links
www.watha.org

References

Languages of Kenya
Hunter-gatherers of Africa